Franklin's Magic Christmas is a 2001 Canadian animated Christmas film. It is the second Franklin film and was released direct-to-video and DVD. It is somewhat shorter than Franklin and the Green Knight and Franklin and the Turtle Lake Treasure. It has since aired on Nick Jr. In the United States, Canada's Family Channel and on Comcast Video on Demand. This movie was loosely based on the book Franklin and Harriet.

Plot
Franklin the Turtle, his little sister, Harriet (introduced in the previous film, Franklin and the Green Knight), and their parents, Mr. and Mrs. Turtle, plan to spend Christmas with their maternal grandparents (Mrs. Turtle's parents) at Faraway Farm, a farm far away from Woodland where Mrs. Turtle grew up.  As the family gets ready to leave, they sing the first and third verses of Deck the Halls.  Franklin immediately becomes annoyed with Harriet when she throws a snowball at him, causing him to drop a large pile of presents.  Franklin's best friend Bear and his little sister Beatrice come to collect Franklin's pet goldfish, Goldie, and Franklin accidentally leaves his favorite stuffed toy dog Sam behind.  Franklin thinks that Harriet dumped Sam in the snow on purpose, when in reality Beatrice had found Sam and Bear had failed to give it back to Franklin before they left.  Franklin is still annoyed with Harriet when they get to Faraway Farm, and he becomes even more annoyed when he learns that he and Harriet will be sleeping in the same room.  Later that evening, his grandmother, Jenny, tells a strange story from her childhood about a reindeer.  This story involves a flashback showing young Jenny and her father (Mrs. Turtle's grandfather and Franklin and Harriet's great-grandfather).  Jenny admits that she might have imagined things just as Mr. Turtle takes a family portrait, in which Franklin gives a sad look because he still misses Sam.  Jenny then shows Franklin Sirius outside and sings Twinkle Twinkle Little Star to him before sending him to bed.

The next day, as Franklin feeds the chickens, Jenny lets him in on a little surprise - she is fixing up an old sleigh for Grandfather Turtle. Franklin decides to help, and Jenny introduces him to her neighbors, the Collies, who collect the polish for the sleigh.  That night, an ice storm strikes, causing a blackout, and while Franklin is checking the attic closet for candles, he comes across the bell from Jenny's story, revealing that she was not imagining the story after all.

Franklin shows the bell to Jenny the next morning (Christmas Eve), and suggests that they use the bell for his grandfather's sleigh.  Jenny has Harriet help with the sleigh, but Harriet spills the beans at lunch, much to Franklin's frustration, although fortunately, his grandfather does not overhear.  Later, Mr. and Mrs. Turtle go to check on the Collies while Franklin and Harriet continue to work on the sleigh.  Despite Franklin telling her not to do so, Harriet rings the bell, and just like in Jenny's story, a reindeer appears.  Franklin runs to the house to tell Jenny.  In the process, Franklin distracts Grandfather Turtle, who slips on a puddle of ice and breaks his leg.  Back in the house, Jenny examines him and tells him to rest.  Grandfather Turtle comforts Harriet when she cries and when Franklin says that he feels guilty, Grandfather Turtle tells him it was simply an accident.  Jenny sends Franklin and Harriet to their room while she cares for Grandfather Turtle.

Franklin decides to use the sleigh to go back to Woodland and find Bear and Beatrice's mother, Dr. Bear.  He eventually discovers that Harriet has come along, hidden in the back.  Rosie the horse, who is pulling the sleigh, is just as surprised as Franklin, and runs away, leaving the two young turtles stranded and lost in the woods.  Back at the farm, Jenny finds a note that Franklin wrote saying that he is going back to Woodland to find Dr. Bear.  Mr. and Mrs. Turtle soon return home from the Collies'; they discover what has happened and they and the grandparents become worried about Franklin and Harriett.  Meanwhile, Franklin angrily antagonizes his little sister for her disobedience, which causes her to cry.  Franklin then comforts and apologizes to her for antagonizing her.  Harriett then reveals that she has the bell.  With Franklin's approval, she rings it, and this time two reindeer come.  One of them has the same exact bell as the one Franklin and Harriet have.  Franklin realizes that the bell must belong to the other reindeer and that this is why he always comes whenever somebody rings it.  With the bell back, the original reindeer creates a harness seemingly out of nowhere.  With the help of the two reindeer, Franklin and Harriett soon arrive at the Bears' house and fetch Dr. Bear.  Back at the farm, Jenny and Mr. and Mrs. Turtle decide to split up and try to find the children.  Rosie returns to the farm and they all see Franklin, Harriet, and Dr. Bear arrive by sleigh.  Dr. Bear gives Grandfather Turtle a cast for his leg and also returns Sam to Franklin, much to his delight.

That night, Franklin and Harriet see Santa Claus and the reindeer out the window.  The film ends with Franklin and Harriet wishing each other a Merry Christmas.

See also
 List of Christmas films

References

External links

TV.com Guide

2001 direct-to-video films
2001 animated films
2000s Christmas films
Canadian direct-to-video films
Canadian animated feature films
Canadian children's animated films
Canadian Christmas films
English-language Canadian films
Animated films based on animated series
Animated films about children
Animated films about turtles
Animated films based on children's books
Nelvana films
2000s children's animated films
Animated Christmas films
Franklin the Turtle (books)
2001 films
2000s English-language films
2000s Canadian films